Frank Howard Watson (born 24 March 1940) was a Bahamian civil servant and politician from Free National Movement.

Early life

The son of William and Olga (née Major) Watson, Watson was born in Long Island, Bahamas. Watson attended Government High School before joining the Customs Department.

He served as Deputy Comptroller of Customs from 1969 to 1977.

Political career

In 1977 and 1982, he ran for election in the Carmichael Constituency. He was elected to office in 1982 and reelected in 1987. In 1992, he was elected as the Member of Parliament for Adelaide.

Watson served in a number of Cabinet posts. He is the former Deputy Prime Minister of the Bahamas, serving from 1992 to 2002. He was succeeded by Cynthia Pratt.

References

1940 births
Deputy Prime Ministers of the Bahamas
Living people
Free National Movement politicians
21st-century Bahamian politicians